A screaming skull is a paranormal object, a human skull which per legend speaks, screams, or otherwise haunts its environs. The legend is most found in England and other English-speaking regions.

The Bettiscombe screaming skull of Dorset, England, is attested at least as early as 1897 in the book The Haunted Homes and Family Traditions of Great Britain. That book details an alleged visit to Bettiscombe in 1883 by curiosity-seekers to investigate a skull which, according to legend, was of an African slave once owned by the owner of the house. The slave had supposedly died determined to be buried in his homeland, and any attempt to bury his skull elsewhere would cause the skull to scream aloud.

Known skulls

Bettiscombe Manor, Bettiscombe, Dorset
Dickie – Tunstead Farm, Tunstead Milton, Derbyshire
Skull of St Ambrose Barlow – Wardley Hall, Greater Manchester 
Skull of Anne Griffith – Burton Agnes Hall, Yorkshire
Skull of Thephilus Brome? – Higher Chilton Farm, Chilton Cantelo
Two skulls – Warbleton Priory ruin, Rushlake Green, Heathfield, East Sussex
Two skulls - Calgarth Hall, Windermere, Cumbria

In fiction
 "The Screaming Skull" (1911) – short story by F. Marion Crawford
 The Screaming Skull (1958) – American horror film
Carrie's War (1973) - novel by Nina Bawden
 The Great Ghost Rescue (1975) – novel by Eva Ibbotson

References

External links 

 In Search of Screaming Skulls – directions to main locations

English folklore
English legendary creatures